Askøy Energi (English: Askoy Energi) is a power company that serves Askøy in Norway. It provides the power grid in the municipality, as well as selling electricity through the subsidiary Askøy Energi Kraftomsetning, with a total of 11,000 customers. It was created as a limited company by the municipality in 1995, but was then sold to Fredrikstad Energi in 2001.

Electric power companies of Norway
Companies based in Hordaland
Askøy
Energy companies established in 1995
Companies formerly owned by municipalities of Norway
Norwegian companies established in 1995